An Institute of Religion is a local organization that provides religious education for young adults (ages 18–30) who are members of the Church of Jesus Christ of Latter-day Saints (LDS Church), with those of other religions also welcome to participate. Local institutes may function in church meetinghouses but may also have a stand-alone building situated adjacent to colleges or universities (especially those found in the Mormon Corridor areas in the Western United States and Canada). The LDS Church describes the purpose of the Institute program as "weekday religious instruction for single and married postsecondary students." Institutes of Religion are professionally directed as part of the Church Educational System, with responsibility for the seminary program and the church's higher education institutions, including Brigham Young University (BYU).

In addition to offering classes, Institutes often sponsor activities, such as dances, aimed at the needs of postsecondary students between 18 and 30 years old. Young adult church members are encouraged, although not required, to be enrolled in an Institute class whenever possible. In areas with a large LDS population, there are often special-needs Institutes that serve adults who have mental or physical handicaps. These Institutes adapt their curricula to meet individual student needs.

Among the standard Institute course offerings are classes on the Book of Mormon, Old Testament, New Testament, the Doctrine and Covenants, and other modern revelation. Institute classes are offered on campus at LDS higher education institutions, such as BYU. However, BYU students are required to take religion classes offered by the university. Students can transfer Institute course credit to BYU for a nominal charge and can graduate from the Institute program after completing 14 course credit hours.

The first Institute of Religion was established in 1926 in Moscow, Idaho, adjacent to the University of Idaho. Its first director was J. Wyley Sessions.  The Logan Institute of Religion was the first institute opened in Utah. There are currently 350,000 students in over 2,700 locations.

Administration

Each institute has an institute director who is hired by Seminaries and Institutes of Religion (S&I). An Institute Council consists of students appointed by the local bishop or branch president. The Institute Council is a non-paid, voluntary position. Ultimate responsibility for the Institute program falls on the Church Board of Education, which is composed of the church's First Presidency, three members of the Quorum of the Twelve Apostles, and other leaders of the LDS Church.

Institute directors often cover large areas. At times Institute directors may be based at a large university with many LDS students and multiple classes where other teachers assist them, but they may also teach an institute class once a week at one or more other universities in the same general area with fewer LDS students.  For example, as of fall 2009, the director of the LDS Institute of Religion in Ann Arbor, Michigan, taught one class a week at Eastern Michigan University and another weekly class at Wayne State University. These were each held on campus under the sponsorship of the LDS Student Association. The director also taught multiple classes at the institute building adjacent to the University of Michigan, while other classes were taught by an S&I missionary couple and part-time, volunteer instructors.

Expanded Institute
By the early 1990s, it was realized that young adults, especially young single adults, who did not attend college or were not currently in college could benefit from Institute.  This included the fact that many schools had few LDS students attending them, and the nature of community colleges meant that there was not an easy concentration of LDS Students. In 1992, the church launched the expanded institute program, with the goal of having virtually every stake offer at least one institute class. These new institute classes were generally taught by volunteer instructors under the same lines of supervision as seminary teachers. The rule for attending institute was either being a young single adult or being a student. All single members of the LDS Church under the age of 31 were encouraged to attend institute where possible.

Institute Outreach Center/Center for Young Adults
Starting in the first years of the 21st century, and accelerating under the leadership of L. Tom Perry while he served as president of the Europe Central Area, the church developed a program called the "Institute Outreach Center", later renamed the "Center for Young Adults". This center focused on four aspects, including institute courses. The others included an activity council that would plan activities geared towards outreach, full-time missionaries who focused on reaching out to men and women of their own age group, and a senior missionary couple that would provide practical and spiritual guidance for the endeavor.

See also
LDS Student Association

Notes

Further reading

External links
Official Institutes website

Church Educational System
Universities, LDS Institutes of Religion adjacent
Properties of the Church of Jesus Christ of Latter-day Saints
Young people and the Church of Jesus Christ of Latter-day Saints
Christian organizations established in 1926
Latter Day Saint church buildings